The Men's 10,000 metres event featured at the 2005 World Championships in Athletics in the Helsinki Olympic Stadium. The final was held on 8 August 2005.

Medalists

Finishing times

References
IAAF results

Events at the 2005 World Championships in Athletics
10,000 metres at the World Athletics Championships